Silene baccifera is a plant species of the genus Silene of the family Caryophyllaceae. It is native to Europe, but is also widespread in temperate regions of Asia and North Africa.

References

baccifera
Flora of Lebanon
Saponaceous plants